Illusion of Gaia, known in PAL territories as Illusion of Time, is an action role-playing video game developed by Quintet for the Super Nintendo Entertainment System. The game was released in Japan by Enix in 1993, and in North America and PAL territories by Nintendo in 1994 and 1995. Set in a fantasy reimagining of Earth, the game's plot centers on a boy named Will who is chosen to save the world from an impending disaster. During the course of the game, the player guides Will through levels based on ancient ruins of real-world civilizations and Wonders of the World, such as the Great Pyramid and the Great Wall of China.

Gameplay
While Illusion of Gaia has a large cast of characters, Will, Freedan and Shadow are the only playable characters in the game. Each has unique abilities, and certain areas are impassable without a specific character. The characters gain techniques as part of the story. Will's techniques are all based on reaching new areas with incidental combat applications. Freedan's techniques are more combat-oriented. Shadow arrives late in the game. 

Combat is fairly simple. Characters share the same health and defense scores, but have different levels of strength. Freedan does more damage than Will and has a longer reach. Shadow does more damage than Freedan. Attacks are almost exclusively melee, using Will's flute, Freedan's sword or Shadow's pseudopod. Enemies' health bars appear upon attacking, displaying as a series of red spheres that represent hit points. Bosses cannot be revisited. Enemies reappear only when Will loses all his lives or leaves an area and returns.

Illusion of Gaia does not use experience points; instead, when the player defeats all enemies in a room, Will receives a jewel that confers a permanent increase in attack, defense, or health power. While returning to a cleared area will cause enemies to reappear, the bonuses for defeating them again do not. When an enemy is killed, it may leave behind a gold sphere worth some number of life points. If Will dies with 100 or more points, the player resumes play at the start of the current stage instead of losing outright.

Illusion of Gaia has no currency or equipment systems. There is only one healing item (herbs), and they are rare. Unlike most games of its type, areas visited previously cannot be revisited, except in the last third of the game. The only side quest, finding all the Red Jewels, cannot be completed if the player fails to find some before advancing the story.

Illusion of Gaia has a fixed difficulty setting. Saving is performed at Dark Spaces, which are found in combat and non-combat areas. Will can recover lost health within the Dark Spaces, and sometimes switch forms or gain abilities.

Plot

Setting
Illusion of Gaia is set in a version of Earth that is partially historical but mostly fantasy-based. The game contains several real-world sites, such as Incan ruins, the Nazca Lines, Angkor Wat, the Great Wall of China and the Egyptian pyramids. Each of these ruins hold a piece to the final puzzle, unveiled in the legendary Tower of Babel.

The story is set in the age of exploration, a period roughly corresponding to the 16th century. Christopher Columbus is mentioned. Explorers search for ancient ruins and their treasures and secrets. Many return with nothing, and some are never seen again. Will, the protagonist of the game, is the lone survivor of such an expedition. He accompanied his father, a famed explorer, on a sea journey to discover the secrets of the Tower of Babel. The explorers met with a mysterious disaster. Somehow Will made it back to his hometown, but he does not remember how.

Story
When the game begins, Will stumbles into a "Dark Space" where he meets a being called Gaia with a human face and a tentacled body. Gaia tells Will that he must leave his home and save the world from a coming evil. A comet is approaching, and it will bring ill fortune to the world. As he travels, Will gains the ability to change into two other forms, each with special powers: Freedan, a dark knight, and Shadow, a solid form of energy.

Later the comet is revealed to be an ancient weapon from the last Blazer War, and has the power to change the shape of the world. In the ruin of Angkor Wat, Will learns that the comet's previous approaches interfered with the evolution of the world.

Will and his friends travel the world and collect artifacts known as Mystic Statues. At the climax, Will and Kara reach the Tower of Babel, where Will is revealed as the Dark Knight and Kara as the Light Knight. The two knights join to form Shadow and use the ancient statues to release the ultimate power, the firebird.

The comet arrives and appears as Dark Gaia. Will and Kara destroy its power, returning the world to normal. The spirits of Will's parents tell Will and Kara that the world will return to normal and that neither of them will preserve any memories of the adventure. Saddened by that fact, Will and Kara join one last time to form Shadow to return to Earth.

The final scene is ambiguous. Will's friends are depicted in what appears to be a modern-day school, implying that even if they forgot about their time together, they remained friends in the "real" world.

Development and release
Illusion of Gaia was scored by Yasuhiro Kawasaki. Moto Hagio is credited with the character designs. Novelist Mariko Ōhara worked on the story. The game is often considered an unofficial trilogy along with two other Quintet games, Soul Blazer (1992) and Terranigma (1995). This series is nicknamed either "Quintet Trilogy", "Gaia Trilogy" or "Heaven and Earth Trilogy" (after Terranigma's Japanese title, which translates to "the creation of Heaven and Earth") by fans.

It was released for the Super Nintendo Entertainment System, in Japan on November 27, 1993, and in North America on September 1, 1994. Developed by Quintet, Enix published the game in Japan, and Nintendo published it worldwide.

A pre-release, English-language version of Illusion of Gaia was leaked onto the World Wide Web in the form of a ROM file. This pre-release version differed in presentation and translation from the final English-language version. For example, the prototype version contained a different title screen, based on the original Japanese-version title screen. The pre-release version portrayed small sprites of the game's main characters running on the surface of a comet. The final version released in the United States came bundled with an instruction booklet that contained one image of an early title screen, which still contained the small sprites at the bottom, but this version had the correct title. In the leaked prototype, the title was presented as SoulBlazer: Illusion of GAIA.

Another notable difference was that many of the original Japanese names were in the English-language pre-release version. For instance, the character "Will" was named "Tim", the character "Kara" was named "Karen" (one instance of this name remained in the released version), and so on.

Some of the script of the English-language prototype was different from the final version. An example included the character "Jeweler Gem" being portrayed as more "sinister".

Finally, Nintendo was not listed in the pre-release version's title credits. It is assumed that the prototype was developed before Nintendo of America decided to publish and market the game in the United States. When Nintendo decided to be the United States publisher, the title was changed and a logo was specifically redesigned to resemble the logo of Nintendo's popular The Legend of Zelda game franchise.

Version differences
In keeping with Nintendo of America's censorship policies at the time of publication, numerous changes were made to the game to make certain story elements less dark. Most notably, the native tribe encountered near Angkor Wat were originally cannibals, with the skeletal remains lying around the village being the remnants of their own tribesmen, whom they had eaten to survive.

Religious references were altered or expunged. Will's school was initially taught by a priest and held in a Christian church. The American release simply identifies the building as a school and replaces a cross with a statue. In the Japanese release, speaking with the priest would cause Will to recite a prayer. In the American release, the teacher leads Will in reciting a poem. A translation error in a sequence near the middle of the game suggests that Seth's consciousness has been absorbed into that of a sea monster named "Riverson". The Japanese version says that he has been transformed into a "Leviathan". A line from the game's climax, in which Will and Kara comment, upon seeing Earth from outer space, that this is what it must feel like to be God, was also removed.

A notable change to the gameplay itself is that the Japanese and American releases feature a different boss in the Sky Garden. In the Japanese version, the boss is simply a giant bird. In the American release, the boss is a winged Babylonian statue with talons.
It is suggested that the American boss could be the creators' initial vision, and tied in with the idea that the Sky Garden was once the Hanging Gardens of Babylon. The developers used the port of the game to "tidy up" the boss, because they were dissatisfied with the bird-snake hybrid used in the original release.

In Europe, the game was released as Illusion of Time in English, German, French and Spanish. Of these, only the French version made significant changes, adding references to existing people or myths, such as Edgar Degas, Franz Kafka, Chrysaor and Nosferatu.

Merchandise
Nintendo released a bundle pack in the United States that, while supplies lasted, included a "one size fits all" T-shirt that depicted the logo, Freedan, and Shadow. As a Nintendo-published title in the U.S., the game received special attention in Nintendo Power magazine and additional merchandise was sold in the Super Power Supplies catalog for subscribers.

Reception

Quintet reported that Illusion of Gaia sold 650,000 cartridges sold worldwide, including 200,000 copies in Japan, 300,000 copies in North America, and 150,000 copies in Europe. In comparison, Soul Blazer had sold 295,000 cartridges worldwide.

GamePro praised the game's puzzle-solving elements, effect-heavy graphics, eclectic soundtrack and gentle difficulty slope. They added that "the game, however, has sacrificed the central theme that gave the original Soulblazer (and ActRaiser before it) a distinct sense of direction and purpose—an impression that your good works have an ongoing impact on the game world. On the other hand, Illusion of Gaia enjoys a sense of worldliness that Soulblazer didn't have. ... you never know quite what's coming next, and that's the best thing that could be said about an RPG".

Accolades
Illusion of Gaia was rated the 186th best game made on a Nintendo system in Nintendo Powers Top 200 Games list in 2006. In 2018, Complex ranked Illusion of Gaia 86th on their "The Best Super Nintendo Games of All Time". In 1995, Total! rated the game 41st in their Top 100 SNES Games, complimenting the graphics and gameplay. IGN ranked Illusion of Gaia 74th on their "Top 100 SNES Games of All Time".

Notes

References

External links
RPGClassics' Illusion of Gaia Shrine
TerraEarth's section on Illusion of Gaia
Critical analysis of Illusion of Gaia

1993 video games
Enix games
Fiction about comets
Role-playing video games
Moto Hagio
Science fantasy video games
Super Nintendo Entertainment System games
Super Nintendo Entertainment System-only games
Quintet (company) games
Video games developed in Japan